94.3 Power Radio (DXJA 94.3 MHz) is an FM station owned by Hypersonic Broadcasting Center and operated by JR Media Resource and Development. Its studios and transmitter are located at Purok Rosas, Brgy. Poblacion 8, Midsayap.

References

External links
Power Radio FB Page

Radio stations in Cotabato
Radio stations established in 2015